Magdagachi Airport  is a small airport in Russia's Amur Oblast, located 3 km north of Magdagachi.  It is an old 1960s-era base in poor condition due to poor maintenance and the often harsh, local climate. Satellite images show that it has a hardened runway, 10 revetments, and a small tarmac apron. During the mid-1970s the U.S. Department of Defense cited this as one of the bases used by the Soviet Union's first two identified air assault brigades. This brigade was the 13th Separate Air Assault Brigade, formed in 1969.

References 

Promzona.org

Airports built in the Soviet Union
Airports in Amur Oblast